Kai-Bastian Evers (born 5 May 1990) is a German footballer who plays for KFC Uerdingen 05.

Career
In the summer 2019, Evers joined VfB Oldenburg on a two-year deal.

References

External links

1990 births
Living people
German footballers
Association football midfielders
Association football defenders
Germany youth international footballers
Borussia Dortmund II players
SV Babelsberg 03 players
Sportfreunde Lotte players
Stuttgarter Kickers players
SV Rödinghausen players
BSV Schwarz-Weiß Rehden players
VfB Oldenburg players
KFC Uerdingen 05 players
3. Liga players
Regionalliga players
People from Lünen
Sportspeople from Arnsberg (region)
Footballers from North Rhine-Westphalia